Sven-Olov Axelsson (born 22 January 1941) is a retired Swedish biathlete. He competed in the 20 km event at the 1964 Winter Olympics and finished 17th.

References

1941 births
Living people
Biathletes at the 1964 Winter Olympics
Olympic biathletes of Sweden
Swedish male biathletes
20th-century Swedish people